AT&T Team USA Soundtrack is a compilation album of various artists, put together for the 2010 Winter Olympics in British Columbia, Canada. It features 12 tracks from artists such as Rascal Flatts, 3 Doors Down, Sugarland and Train, among others. It was released on iTunes.

All proceeds from sales of the album made through March 1, 2010 benefited Team USA.

Rascal Flatts re-recorded its single "Unstoppable" with slightly altered lyrics for their contribution to the album. The new lyrics celebrate the spirit of competition of the games.

Track listing
"Shine" performed by 3 Doors Down
"Move Along" performed by The All-American Rejects
"In the Zone" performed by David Banner and BJ the Chicago Kid
"The World Is Ours Tonight" performed by Gloriana
"Rise Up" performed by Green River Ordinance
"Can't Box Me In" performed by Honor Society
"Never Be Here Again" performed by Hoobastank
"100%" performed by Mariah Carey
"Shook Up the World" performed by Puddle of Mudd
"Unstoppable (Olympics Mix)" performed by Rascal Flatts
"Wide Open" performed by Sugarland
"The Finish Line" performed by Train
"Forever Young" performed by The Pretenders

References

2010 compilation albums
Sports compilation albums
2010 Winter Olympics
Charity albums